The Battle of Kaliakra, usually known as the Attack of the Drazki in Bulgaria, was a maritime action between four Bulgarian torpedo boats and the Ottoman cruiser Hamidiye in the Black Sea. It took place on 21 November 1912 at 32 miles off Bulgaria's primary port of Varna.

During the course of the First Balkan War, the Ottoman Empire's supplies were dangerously limited after the battles in Kirk Kilisse and Lule Burgas and the sea route from the Romanian port Constanţa to Istanbul became vital for the Ottomans. The Ottoman navy also imposed a blockade on the Bulgarian coast and on 15 October, the commander of the cruiser Hamidiye threatened to destroy Varna and Balchik, unless the two towns surrendered.

On 21 November an Ottoman convoy was attacked by the four Bulgarian torpedo boats Drazki (Bold), Letyashti (Flying), Smeli (Brave) and Strogi (Strict). The attack was led by Letyashti, whose torpedoes missed, as did those of Smeli and Strogi, Smeli being damaged by a 150 mm round with one of her crewmen wounded. Drazki however got within 100 meters from the Ottoman cruiser and her torpedoes struck the cruiser's starboard side, causing a 10 square meter hole.

However, Hamidiye was not sunk, due to her well-trained crew, strong forward bulkheads, the functionality of all her water pumps and a very calm sea. She did however have 8 crewmen killed and 30 wounded, and was repaired within months.

After this encounter, the Ottoman blockade of the Bulgarian coast was significantly loosened.

References
The attack of Drazki 
 E.R. Horton, Prelude to the First World War: The Balkan Wars 1912–1913
 
 

Naval Battle of Kaliakra
Naval battles involving Bulgaria
Naval battles involving the Ottoman Empire
History of Varna, Bulgaria
Military history of the Black Sea
Naval battles of the First Balkan War
November 1912 events